The fourth and penultimate season of the American television series Gotham, based on characters from DC Comics related to the Batman franchise, revolves around the characters of James "Jim" Gordon and Bruce Wayne. The season is produced by Primrose Hill Productions, DC Entertainment, and Warner Bros. Television, with Bruno Heller, Danny Cannon, and John Stephens serving as executive producers. The season was inspired and adapted elements from the comic book storylines of Batman: Year One, Batman: The Long Halloween, and Batman: No Man's Land. The subtitle for the season is A Dark Knight.

The season was ordered in May 2017, and production began the following month. Ben McKenzie stars as Gordon, alongside Donal Logue, David Mazouz, Morena Baccarin, Sean Pertwee, Robin Lord Taylor, Erin Richards, Camren Bicondova, Cory Michael Smith, Jessica Lucas, Chris Chalk, Drew Powell, Crystal Reed and Alexander Siddig. The fourth season premiered on September 21, 2017, on Fox, while the second half premiered on March 1, 2018. The season concluded on May 17, 2018.

The season received positive reviews from critics and audiences, who cited the character development, writing and action sequences as highlights of the season, with some calling it the best season yet. The premiere was watched by 3.21 million viewers with a 1.0 in the 18–49 demo, which was a 17% decline from the previous season premiere but on par with last season's average. Despite remaining with consistent ratings throughout the first half of the season, the second half experienced new series lows in the spring and being in danger of cancellation. Despite the ratings drop, Fox renewed the show for a fifth and final season on May 13, 2018.

Premise
Crime in Gotham has been reined in by Penguin, who has issued a law in the underworld that licenses must be obtained before any criminal activity. However, things turn out for the worse when Jim goes to Carmine Falcone for help; his daughter Sofia arrives in Gotham with the intent of rebuilding her family empire. At the same time, Riddler escapes his icy prison and allies with Lee, who has become leader of the Narrows. Serving as their enforcer is an amnesiac resurrected Butch, who now goes by the name Solomon Grundy. 

During the second half of the season, Jerome Valeska breaks out of Arkham Asylum with the Mad Hatter and the Scarecrow, hatching a plot to plunge Gotham City into anarchy. Although he is ultimately killed, he manages to drive his twin brother Jeremiah Valeska insane by exposing him to Scarecrow's chemical gas. Jeremiah forms an alliance with the immortal Ra's al Ghul to threaten the city and push Bruce Wayne into fulfilling his destiny as "Gotham's Dark Knight".

Cast and characters

Main
 Ben McKenzie as James "Jim" Gordon
 Donal Logue as Harvey Bullock
 David Mazouz as Bruce Wayne
 Morena Baccarin as Leslie "Lee" Thompkins
 Sean Pertwee as Alfred Pennyworth
 Robin Lord Taylor as Oswald Cobblepot / Penguin
 Erin Richards as Barbara Kean
 Camren Bicondova as Selina Kyle
 Cory Michael Smith as Edward Nygma / Riddler
 Jessica Lucas as Tabitha Galavan / Tigress
 Chris Chalk as Lucius Fox
 Drew Powell as Butch Gilzean / Cyrus Gold / Solomon Grundy
 Crystal Reed as Sofia Falcone
 Alexander Siddig as Ra's al Ghul

Recurring
 Anthony Carrigan as Victor Zsasz
 Maggie Geha and Peyton List as Ivy "Pamela" Pepper / Poison Ivy
 Andrew Sellon as Arthur Penn
 Charlie Tahan and David W. Thompson as Jonathan Crane / Scarecrow
 Kelcy Griffin as Detective Vanessa Harper
 Nathan Darrow as Victor Fries / Mr. Freeze
 Marina Benedict as Cherry
 Michael Cerveris as Lazlo Valentin / Professor Pyg
 Camila Perez and Michelle Veintimilla as Bridgit Pike / Firefly
 Christopher Convery as Martin
 Cameron Monaghan as Jerome and Jeremiah Valeska
 Benedict Samuel as Jervis Tetch / Mad Hatter
J.W. Cortes as Detective Alvarez

Guest
 Michael Maize as Grady Harris
 Damian Young as Warden Reed
 Nico Bustamante as Orphan
 Michael Buscemi as Merton
 Larry Pine as Mayor Burke
 John Doman as Carmine Falcone
 Ilana Becker as Myrtle Jenkins
 Dakin Matthews as Niles Winthrop
 Benjamin Stockham as Alex Winthrop
 Owen Harn as The Hunter
 Anthony Rodriguez as Anubis
 Albert M. Chan as Pharmacist
 Will Janowitz as Wally Clarke
 Gordon Winarick as Tommy Elliot
 Samia Finnerty as Grace Blomdhal
 Tommy Nelson as Brant Jones
 Kyle Vincent Terry as Headhunter
 Stu "Large" Riley as Sampson
 Thomas Lyons as Griffin Krank
 Chris Perfetti as Cosmo Krank
 Francesca Root-Dodson as Ecco
 B. D. Wong as Hugo Strange
 Alison Fraser as Gertrude Haverstock

Episodes

Production

Development
The show was officially renewed by Fox for a fourth season on May 10, 2017. Just like the second and third seasons, the fourth season also carried a new subtitle for the season: A Dark Knight.

Writing
The producers revealed that the season would be based on the comic book stories Batman: The Long Halloween and Batman: Year One. According to executive producer John Stephens, the season would not consist of "direct adaptations", but "loose interpretations" of the comic book series. Ben McKenzie explained that the structure for the season would be "the beginning is more Long Halloween, our version of that, and the end is more Year One." According to Stephens, the show would handle a horror-oriented direction on the season: "At the very beginning of the season, Penguin has solidified his control upon Gotham like never before. Where he's kind of unionized crime. And Scarecrow comes in to basically reintroduce fear into Gotham and to remind people that the dark is still scary out there. And we're really going to fashion, especially Episode 2, almost a horror movie episode where we really get to see Scarecrow. I think he's like purely terrifying. Imagine, rather than the other versions of Scarecrow out there—because there are a lot of different versions—what if you just really tell Scarecrow as a horror movie? Because he could be scary as hell." Executive producer Danny Cannon stated, "When the studio asks you to tone back because it's too scary, you know you've done something right!"

Regarding Bruce's beginning of vigilantism, McKenzie explained that "We are definitely leaning into Bruce, having learned some of the skills to be a vigilante, now actually attempting it. Now, we have a long, long way to go before he can realistically be Batman, so there will be many stumbles and falls – and regressions back to being a kid at times – but Gordon will eventually become aware of what he's doing and that will bring them against each other." David Mazouz also added, "Bruce really is taking on this vigilante persona and all the things that go along with that. Whether it be creating another persona, a public persona, that's also definitely going to be a major part of Bruce's journey this year. His relationship as this other person. Batman is coming. Absolutely." Mazouz also stated that he was worried the writers could pull back some aspects from Batman, deeming it "too fast" but he was glad it didn't stop. He said that Bruce would take the "Batman persona" this season. Cannon also explained that Bruce will be seen "as the emerging threat he is." Alexander Siddig stated that his character will seek to make Bruce his heir and will "do anything he can to get his hands on him, to manipulate him into what [Ra's] wants him to be." He also claimed that the season is "a season so far of extremes."

Talking about his character, McKenzie stated, "Comparatively, perhaps he's in a better place than some of these other truly evil, evil people." But as the season will be with him dealing with Cobblepot, Gordon "doesn't have a lot of good options. He has to either fight him directly or find allies to fight Penguin—surrogates to fight Penguin—which leads him down a dark path. So, that's kind of the way we start for him in season 4." According to Stephens, "We're going to see Jim make, in some ways, big steps toward I guess what you would call the commissionership. But also we're going to see Jim, in his quest to save the city, cross different ethical lines than he ever did before. It's going to bring him to an ethical nadir that we haven't seen him at, and it's going to be told through the context of a relationship that he has with Sofia Falcone, the daughter of Don Falcone, who's played by Crystal Reed this year. And that's going to be a really compelling and interesting relationship." Sean Pertwee also stated that the season will also explore Alfred's mysterious past "indirectly".

McKenzie made his writing debut on the episode "The Demon's Head", after previously directing the third-season episode "These Delicate and Dark Obsessions". McKenzie went to Los Angeles to work on the writers' room to break the story and then go back to New York City and finish many drafts. He explained, "I've been fiddling around with writing for a long time, but I'd never written an episode of television, so it was quite a learning process." He also added that, "From being on a set, the directing came fairly naturally. It was challenging, but there were a lot of things that I understood about directing just from observing, just from watching director's work. Writing often takes place behind-the-scenes. Physical production is not privy to how scripts come out... I wasn't so familiar with that process of breaking a story, of starting with a story document, then an outline, and then a draft; it was informative".

For the second half of the season, Cameron Monaghan stated that "We're borrowing very heavily from some of the most iconic Batman storylines. I think that they're deep enough, and they show where its really splitting that duality and start totally embracing the main arcs. I think that we did a little bit in season three to bring it into The Killing Joke." He also added that the plan for the final episodes is to adapt Batman: No Man's Land, stating, "We're really getting into it this year. I think the way that the story escalates is something that shifts and is not anything the show has done before. I think it's going to be a really unique experience. Especially by the past few episodes, it's going to be really... it's pretty insane."

Casting

With the exception of Benedict Samuel and Michael Chiklis, all main actors from the previous season returned for the show, with Maggie Geha being downgraded to guest star. Crystal Reed joined the series in July 2017 in the series regular role of Sofia Falcone. Alexander Siddig was promoted to the main cast. In September 2017, Michael Cerveris joined the show as Lazlo Valentin / Professor Pyg, in a multi-episode role. Cerveris stated, "Professor Pyg is a brilliant and chameleon-like person who has a highly developed sense of what's right and wrong—it just might not be a sense of right and wrong that corresponds with everybody else's." He also added that, "When they [the writers] had somebody who played Sweeney Todd, they knew the direction they wanted to go... [Broadway fans who don't watch Gotham] might give it a look simply because of that, and find that they have a new favorite show." Regarding the Dollotrons, Cerveris stated, "You know how much he's liked the Pyg in the comics, but I would say that his focus in Gotham is more on things to do with Gotham and with the city and with Jim Gordon. He's certainly is the manipulative character, and certainly, you know, is trying to get people to do stuff whether they know why they're doing it or not. But, that's sort of exclusive. His whole reason for existing is not the Dollotrons." He described the character as having "a Hannibal Lecter-ish quality." He also jokingly added that he couldn't eat bacon "because I just can't bring myself to eat my little friends." Donal Logue stated, "We have Michael Cerveris coming in and playing Professor Pyg and he's such an incredibly gifted actor and, as happens a lot, the gentlest and most gifted of artistic souls can play the darkest, creepiest human beings known to literature or film." 

Besides, the character of Tommy Elliot was also set to return to the show, having appeared in the episode "The Mask". However, co-executive producer Bryan Wynbrandt added, "Obviously when Tommy Elliot is discussed, there's always is that Hush storyline. That is something that we've discussed. Right now, we're kind of still feeling that out. It could be something on the horizon, but I can't say for sure." Also, Peyton List was cast as a new iteration of Ivy Pepper. According to Bryan Wynbrandt, "The change was all based on the idea that she's continuing to evolve to become more of the Ivy from the comic books and what we really enjoyed. In this third evolution you're going to see a really self possessed, really scary and driven version of the Ivy character, who is intent on kind of making the world in the image she sees it should be, which is the green world. The world where the plants rule and people are an after thought."

As a concept McKenzie wished to explore, the fourth season was set to bring back the actor Charlie Tahan as Jonathan Crane / Scarecrow, who portrayed the character on the first-season episodes: "The Fearsome Dr. Crane" and "The Scarecrow". A trailer was screened on the 2017 San Diego Comic-Con that showed Crane donning a new costume under the Scarecrow persona. McKenzie explained: "So we met his father Dr Crane in Season 1. So we've taken our time; we're gonna come back now to his son. You know, in circumstances probably not best described now, his son takes on his father's mantle and becomes the fully-realized Scarecrow. It's great. We're able to use this sort of fear toxin that Scarecrow is able to summon. We're completely unafraid—or perhaps afraid but we still persist–in expanding the universe and our capabilities." Tahan commented on his character, "He's sort of trying to build an army with this toxin. Scarecrow might start brainwashing people. I'm not exactly sure what his endgame is—I don't even know if he knows. He has this revelation that he doesn't have to fear fear." However, due to Tahan's commitment to the series Ozark, the role ended up recast with David W. Thompson, who portrayed him in the second half of the season.

When asked about Jerome Valeska's return in the season, Stephens stated, "What I will say about Jerome is that Jerome is in Arkham right now, and when you think about Arkham's record of keeping people locked up, we will probably see him again before the end of the year." In September 2017, Stephens explained, "You're totally gonna see him this year. You're gonna see him in a new position this year", also teasing that Jerome would be an ally to Penguin on the season. Ben McKenzie said, "Jerome is one of our most beloved characters. The idea here was to really give the audience more time to enjoy and savor [Cameron Monaghan's] performance." Regarding the partnership between Jerome and Penguin, Robin Lord Taylor said "You have Jerome, who is chaos, and you have Oswald, who is control. So you can imagine, there are ways that those can integrate, but at the same time they're opposites." Stephens also added that Fish Mooney is "gone for good", saying, "Now, that one was it. At a certain point, you gotta say 'Definitely.' People die at a certain point, and that's the second or third time they die [on Gotham]"

Filming
Filming for the season began on June 20, 2017, at Steiner Studios in Brooklyn, New York. In January 2018, it was announced that Ben McKenzie would direct an episode after making his directional debut the previous season. It was later revealed that he would be directing the 16th episode, titled "One of My Three Soups". Production on the season officially wrapped in late March 2018.

Release

Broadcast
The season was originally set to air on September 28, 2017, on Fox in the United States. However, on July 28, 2017, Fox decided to move up the premiere to September 21, 2017 in order to give its companion newcomer series The Orville a continuous run. The fourth season is moving to a Thursday timeslot, alongside The Orville, after airing its past seasons on Mondays.

Marketing
In July 2017, the cast and crew attended San Diego Comic-Con to discuss and promote the season, showing a five-minute sizzle reel from season 3 as well as the debut trailer for the season. The second episode "The Fear Reaper" was screened on September 23, 2017, when Cannon, McKenzie, Taylor, Bicondova, Mazouz, Pertwee and Lucas promoted the series at the inaugural Tribeca TV Festival. Besides, the cast will attend the New York Comic Con in October 2017 to promote the season as well as a Q&A presentation with the cast. The season was also heavily marketed by trailers showcasing Bruce's beginning of vigilantism as well as Jonathan Crane's debut, both of whom received positive response from audience with Digital Spys Justin Hart commenting, "Sounds like a perfect time for young Bruce Wayne to finally embrace his destiny as a masked vigilante, doesn't it?" while Albert Achar from IndieWire commented, "it looks like it is going to be a very wild ride."

As part of promotion for the ninth episode "Let Them Eat Pie", Fox released a "red band" trailer featuring Michael Cerveris as Professor Pyg, teasing a Sweeney Todd storyline in the episode as well as a musical number, which was considered by TV Guide as "insane."

Home media
The season is set to be released on Blu-ray on August 21, 2018. On August 15, 2018, the season was made available on Netflix UK and Ireland one month prior to its Region 2 DVD release.

Reception

Ratings

The premiere was watched by 3.21 million viewers with a 1.0 in the 18–49 demo, which was a 17% decline from the previous season premiere but on par with last season's average.

Critical response
The review aggregator website Rotten Tomatoes reported an 81% approval rating with an average rating of 6.88/10 based on 21 reviews.

Accolades

References

Gotham (TV series) seasons
2017 American television seasons
2018 American television seasons